Vasili Vladimirovich Pletin (born 28 September 1992) is a Russian former football midfielder.

Club career
He made his debut in the Russian Second Division for FC Smena Komsomolsk-na-Amure on 15 July 2012 in a game against FC Sibiryak Bratsk.
 
He made his Russian Football National League debut for FC SKA-Energiya Khabarovsk on 9 March 2014 in a game against PFC Spartak Nalchik.

References

External links
 
 
 

1992 births
Sportspeople from Khabarovsk
Living people
Russian footballers
Association football midfielders
FC SKA-Khabarovsk players
FC Smena Komsomolsk-na-Amure players
FC TSK Simferopol players
Crimean Premier League players